State Route 257 (SR 257, OH 257) is a  north - south state highway in the central portion of the U.S. state of Ohio. The highway's southern terminus is in the northwestern Columbus suburb of Dublin at a roundabout intersection with U.S. Route 33 (US 33) and SR 161. This mainly two-lane highway follows the eastern side of the Scioto River from Dublin to its junction with US 42. After crossing over the river with the U.S. highway, SR 257 parallels the river's western bank. SR 257 has its northern terminus at a T-intersection with SR 47 on the western village limits of Prospect. SR 257 was created in 1926, and extended in 1935 and 1937.

Route description

Along its way, SR 257 travels primarily north through northwestern Franklin County, western Delaware County and the extreme southern part of Marion County, following the Scioto River for most of the way.

SR 257 starts at the intersection of US 33 / SR 161. The route moves north intersecting with Emerald Parkway. SR 257 continues north to Hard Road, and past Thaddeus Kosciuszko Park.  After crossing the Franklin–Delaware county line, the next major junction is with SR 750 at the Columbus Zoo and Aquarium and the O'Shaughnessy Dam.  From here to US 42 the route follows the eastern bank of O'Shaughnessy Reservoir.  The next intersection is Seldom Seen Road. Two miles later, SR 257 meets Home Road at a traffic circle. Home Road provides access to SR 745 heading west and to Sawmill Parkway and Liberty Rd heading east.

SR 257 continues north to signaled intersection with US 42 and runs concurrently with US 42 for about 1 mile within Concord Township. The route travels southwest with US 42 across the Scioto River. At the signalized northern terminus of SR 745 the concurrency ends, as SR 257 turns north. Continuing north, SR 257 crosses SR 37 at a flashing red light. After nine miles, the route crosses into Marion County prior to ending at OH 47 in Prospect, crossing minor roads within Thompson Township in between.

History

The SR 257 designation was applied in 1926. Originally, the highway was routed along its present southernmost alignment along the eastern banks of the Scioto River between Dublin and its northeastern junction with US 42.

In 1935, SR 257 was extended via a short concurrency with US 42 across the Scioto River, then north along its present alignment along the western side of the river to a new northern terminus at SR 37 west of Delaware.  Then, two years after its first northward extension, SR 257 was extended to the north again, this time to its present northern terminus at SR 47 in Prospect.

SR 257 was designated the General Thaddeus Kosciusko Memorial Highway in December 1975.

Major intersections

References

257
Dublin, Ohio
Transportation in Franklin County, Ohio
Transportation in Delaware County, Ohio
Transportation in Marion County, Ohio